The Oslo International School (OIS) is an international school in Bekkestua, Norway.

History 
Oslo International School, which is organised as a not-for-profit educational trust, was founded in 1963. During the 1960s, the school grew from a primary of about 36 pupils to around 180 pupils. Today there are around 600 students from approximately 50 nations.

Description 
OIS is a fully accredited independent international day school for students from 3 – 19 years of age (pre-school to IB Diploma). The last two years of the upper secondary are authorised as a world school by the International Baccalaureate Organisation. OIS is located in modern, architecturally unique facilities in a green suburban neighbourhood and is close to Bekkestua, which is a public transportation hub. A school bus service is on offer to all children.

References

External links

 Oslo International School

International Baccalaureate schools in Norway
Secondary schools in Norway
Primary schools in Norway
International schools in Norway
Education in Bærum